Kaattum Mazhayum is an unreleased Indian Malayalam-language film directed by Hari Kumar, starring Lal and Unni Mukundan in lead roles. The rest of the cast includes Meera Nandan, Irshad, Praveena, Mamukoya, Sudheesh, Balachandran Chulllikad, Maala Paravathi, and Swasika, Master Kashi [Tapan]. Cinematography is done by M. J. Radhakrishanan. Music By M Jayachandran, Lyrics By Rafeeq Ahammed, Edited By Vijaya Shankar. Hari Kumar was accused of stealing the story of Kaattum Mazhayum from scriptwriter Najeem Koya, by which Harikumar earned Kerala State Film Award for Best Story through this film.

Plot

Jayanarayanan is a Brahmin boy from a financially poor family. On the other hand, Haajiyar is a Muslim man from a higher financial background who is suffering from kidney failure and is in need of a kidney transplant. Jayanarayanan is in need of money for his marriage and agrees to sell his kidney. However, Lal's relatives don't want him to get the kidney transplant, as they will get his property and money after his death. The relatives delay the transplantation by saying that an organ from a Brahmin boy cannot be taken by a Muslim, as it is not religiously correct. They ask Jayanarayanan to become Muslim in order to give the organ. Jayanarayanan agrees on the conversion, as he badly needs money for the marriage. In the end, Lal is no longer alive when Jayanarayanan comes to Lal's home soon after converting to Islam. However, in a twist, it is shown that before Lal died, he had already given a cheque to his servant to hand over to Jayanarayanan for the financial toll his marriage took.

Cast
Unni Mukundan as Jayanarayanan
Lal as Haajiyar
Meera Nandan as Anjali
Praveena as Deepa
Irshad
Mamukoya
Sudheesh
Swasika
Balachandran Chulllikad
Maala Parvathi
 Master Kashi

References

Unreleased Malayalam-language films